Vermont Law and Graduate School (VLGS) is a private law and public policy graduate school in South Royalton, Vermont. It offers several degrees, including Juris Doctor (JD), Master of Laws (LLM) in Environmental Law, Master of Environmental Law and Policy (MELP), Master of Food and Agriculture Law and Policy (MFALP), Master of Energy Regulation and Law (MERL), and dual degrees with a diverse range of institutions. According to the school's 2018 ABA-required disclosures, 61.5% of the Class of 2018 obtained full-time, long-term, JD-required employment nine months after graduation.

History

Vermont Law School was founded in 1972 by Anthony Doria and held its first classes in the summer of 1973 with 113 students in what was then known as the old South Royalton schoolhouse. In December 1973, VLS was certified by the Vermont State Board of Education as an institution of higher learning. Doria resigned as dean of the school in 1974, after it emerged that he had been convicted of embezzlement by a Pennsylvania court in 1958, though the charges were later vacated. Provisional ABA approval came in February 1975, and a full complement of classes were offered in the fall of 1975. The Law School's charter class graduated in spring 1976. Full approval by the ABA came in 1978, and the Law School was accredited by the New England Association of Schools and Colleges (NEASC) in 1980. VLS became a member of the Association of American Law Schools (AALS) in 1981. In 2018, the law school controversially stripped tenure from 75% of its faculty, citing financial exigencies.

The school added additional graduate programs and a hybrid JD program in 2022; in July of that year, Vermont Law School rebranded as Vermont Law and Graduate School.

Solomon Amendment 
Vermont Law School was one of two law schools in the U.S. to decline to receive federal funding under the Solomon Amendment. That statute passed by Congress required colleges and universities to allow military recruitment on campus or risk losing federal funding.  The school is also part of FAIR Forum for Academic and Institutional Rights, a consortium of 38 law schools and law faculties that challenged the Solomon Amendment in Rumsfeld v. FAIR, and lost. Following the repeal of 'Don't Ask Don't Tell' in 2011, the school has allowed military recruitment on campus.

Academics
As well as the Juris Doctor (JD), the Law School offers several degrees and joint-degrees, as well as degrees with other universities. Degrees include Master of Laws (LLM) in Environmental Law, Master of Laws (LLM) in American Legal Studies, Master of Laws (LLM) in Food and Agriculture Law, and Master of Laws (LLM) in Energy Law; Master of Environmental Law and Policy (MELP), Master of Energy Regulation and Law (MERL), and Master of Food and Agriculture Law and Policy (MFALP). Vermont Law School also offers an Accelerated Juris Doctor program that allows JD students to graduate in just two years (as opposed to the traditional three-year JD program), through the completion of two full-time academic semesters during the summer.
  
The Law School has partnered with different domestic and international universities to offer dual-degree programs. Domestic schools include: Yale School of Forestry & Environmental Studies (JD/Master of Environmental Management),  Tuck School of Business at Dartmouth (MELP/Master of Business Administration), the University of Vermont Rubenstein School of Natural Resources (MELP/Master of Science in Natural Resources), Thunderbird School of Global Management (JD/Masters of Business Administration), the University of South Carolina (MELP/JD), University of South Dakota (MELP/JD), and Northeastern University School of Law (MELP/JD). International universities include the University of Cambridge (JD/master of philosophy), Cergy-Pontoise University (France), and the University of Seville (Spain).

In 2022, the ABA's Section of Legal Education and Admissions to the Bar determined VLGS had failed to significantly comply with Standard 316, which was revised in 2019 to provide that at least 75% of an accredited law school's graduates who took a bar exam must pass one within two years of graduation.  Graduates in 2019 had a 67.54% bar pass rate.  However, VLGS had an 82.84% pass rate in 2018, and the school described the 2019 results as an anomaly.  The ABA determined the school was back in compliance by March of 2023.

Julien and Virginia Cornell Library 
The Julien and Virginia Cornell Library opened in 1991. The library contains over 250,000 print volumes, including primary and secondary legal materials focusing on state, national, and international law. The library also possesses a collection of microforms including congressional documents, state session laws, and briefs. The library's electronic collection includes access to LexisNexis and Westlaw and other online gateways and databases, as well as a large catalog of full-text electronic journals and books and databases offering primary legal materials.

Vermont Law School maintains "an extensive interdisciplinary environmental collection, including journals, monographs, electronic resources, and other material related to the study of the environment and environmental law and policy."

Campus

Vermont Law and Graduate School's  campus is located in South Royalton in central Vermont. The campus is set just above the broad banks of the White River.

The oldest and centermost classroom building on the campus is Debevoise Hall, the town's original schoolhouse, built in 1892. In 2005 the former town schoolhouse (the original Law School building in 1973) was renovated and renamed after one of the first deans of the Law School, Thomas M. Debevoise. Practicing what it preaches, the Law School emphasized environmental concerns in the renovation, as well as historical preservation and design efficiency. Debevoise Hall was the only LEED Silver Certified renovation building project in the state of Vermont. Debevoise Hall continues to serve as classroom space and now also houses administration offices, the Environmental Law Center, and the Yates Common Room.

The James L. and Evelena S. Oakes Hall building was constructed and dedicated in 1998. Oakes Hall incorporates "green building" techniques along with the latest classroom technology.

Jonathon Chase, the late former dean of the Law School, liked to joke that South Royalton was the only town in America "with a law school and no stop light." Vermont Law School holds the distinction of being the law school farthest from a traffic light.  As of January 2021, South Royalton does not have a stoplight.

In January 2020, VLGS opened a new satellite office in Burlington, which hosts the school's immigration law clinic and additional admissions office.

Centers, institutes, clinics, and programs

Law centers and research institutes
 Environmental Law Center — The Environmental Law Center (ELC) began in 1978 with eight master's degree students. As noted, the ELC's program is consistently top-ranked by U.S. News & World Report. The ELC confers both the Master of Environmental Law and Policy (MELP) and Master of Laws in Environmental Law (LLM) degrees. The Class of 2008 included 87 students receiving these master's degrees.
 Center for Agriculture and Food Systems (CAFS) — The Center for Agriculture and Food Systems (CAFS) has a dual mission: to train the next generation of food and agriculture advocates and entrepreneurs, and to create innovative legal tools supporting the new food movement. CAFS trains students through a comprehensive array of residential and distance learning courses and a Food and Agriculture Clinic. VLGS offers a JD Certificate in Food and Agriculture, and both Master's and LLM degrees in Food and Agriculture Law and Policy. CAFS' diverse course offerings, law clinic and degree options make it the most comprehensive sustainable food, agriculture, and environmental law graduate program in the country. CAFS also publishes a variety of resources on food and agriculture policy topics.
 Institute for Energy & the Environment — The Institute for Energy and the Environment (IEE) is a national and international resource for energy law and policy. The Institute offers a full course curriculum and a certificate of concentration during the academic year and through its Energy Summer seminars; distributes scholarly, technical, and practical publications; provides forums and conferences for professional education and issue development; and serves as a center for graduate research on energy issues, with an environmental awareness.  The Institute’s research team is selected from top students in the energy and environmental programs at Vermont Law School.  The Institute maintains the IEE blog focused on current events and research.
 Environmental Tax Policy Institute — The Institute analyzes ways in which taxation can address environmental problems. As a resource for the public and private sectors, non-governmental organizations, the press and academia, the Institute seeks to better inform the public policy debate about the role of environmental taxes at the local, state and federal levels.
 Land Use Institute — The Land Use Institute (LUI) addresses intensifying land use law and policy issues at the local, national, and international levels that critically pertain to the development of a sustainable society. These issues include application of smart growth principles, ecological planning, affordable housing, flood hazard mitigation, improving the confluence of energy and land use regulatory decision-making and other permitting processes, and land conservation strategies. LUI works with VLS faculty and students, and other nonprofit legal and professional planning partners, to provide sound and innovative information, experience, and education to advance the practice of land use law and planning. This mission is served through direct support for local and regional planning agencies, forums and conferences for issue development, preparation of legislation affecting critical land use issues, education and training for state and local land use planners and regulators, practical and scholarly publications, and graduate professional teaching.

Clinics and experiential programs
 Environmental Advocacy Clinic — The Environmental Advocacy Clinic assists major conservation organizations and local community groups to promote access to justice on important environmental and natural resources issues. In 2019, the National Wildlife Federation selected the Environmental Advocacy Clinic to represent the Federation on its national legal advocacy work.
Environmental Justice Clinic — Launched in 2019, the Environmental Justice Clinic became one of the only law clinics specifically devoted to environmental justice, providing legal services to low income communities and communities of color fighting the unjust distribution of pollution sources within those areas.
Energy Clinic—Started in 2014, the Energy Clinic is one of the only law clinics in the United States focused on promoting climate justice and renewable energy. The Energy Clinic provides opportunities for students to progressively develop the knowledge, skills, and values integral to the field of energy law and policy, while helping clients meet local energy needs with reliable, clean, and affordable resources.
Food and Agriculture Clinic — Students in the Food and Agriculture Clinic collaborate with local, regional, national, and international partners, and engage in law and policy work that addresses challenges related to food and land justice, public health, the economy, food security, and animal welfare.
 South Royalton Legal Clinic — The South Royalton Legal Clinic serves Vermont residents who are unable to afford counsel and who need assistance with issues such as bankruptcy, children’s rights, disability, domestic violence, family law, housing, immigration, veterans issues and wills.
Legislative Clinic — In the Legislative Clinic, students to work under the supervision of attorneys supporting the work of the Vermont General Assembly. Under the supervision of the Vermont Legislative Council, students work on bills, amendments, and related research projects. They observe floor debates, attend committee hearings, and participate in hearings as needed by the committees.
Immigration Clinic — Expanded alongside the opening of the Burlington satellite office in 2020, this clinic offers assistance to Vermonters on issues of immigration law.
 General Practice Program — The General Practice Program (GPP) was instituted in 1987. The GPP is recipient of the American Bar Association's E. Smythe Gambrell Award for Professionalism, a national award for law schools and other organizations in recognition for advancing professionalism in the practice of law.
 Legal Clinic of Petrozavodsk State University — Under the patronage of Vermont School of Law at the Faculty of Petrozavodsk State University opened the first legal clinic in Russia in October 1995, supported by the Council of Judges.

Employment 
According to Vermont Law School's official 2018 ABA-required disclosures, 61.5% of the Class of 2018 obtained full-time, long-term, JD-required employment nine months after graduation. Vermont Law School's Law School Transparency under-employment score is 29%, indicating the percentage of the Class of 2013 unemployed, pursuing an additional degree, or working in a non-professional, short-term, or part-time job nine months after graduation.

Tuition and financial aid
JD tuition for 2018-19 is $48,254.  67.4% percent of students receive some sort of scholarship.

Publications
Vermont Law School students publish two legal journals, the Vermont Law Review and the Vermont Journal of Environmental Law, on a regular basis several times a year in print and online. In addition to regular publication, both journals sponsor annual symposia.

Notable faculty and administrators
 Peter A. Bradford, current professor at Vermont Law School, former member of the U.S. Nuclear Regulatory Commission
 Mark Cooper, senior research fellow for economic analysis at VLS' Institute for Energy and the Environment
 Douglas M. Costle, former Dean of Vermont Law School and former Environmental Protection Agency Administrator
 Molly Gray, elected Lieutenant governor of Vermont in 2020, instructor of international human rights law courses
 Philip H. Hoff, former Vermont Law School Trustee, 1983–1999, Trustee Emeritus beginning in 1999
 Shirley Jefferson, associate dean and law school professor at Vermont Law School
 Denise R. Johnson, first woman appointed to the Vermont Supreme Court, instructor in legal writing, 1978–1980
 Deborah Markowitz, Secretary of the Vermont Agency of Natural Resources, former Vermont Secretary of State, adjunct professor
 James L. Oakes, Judge of the United States Court of Appeals for the Second Circuit, Vermont Law School Board of Trustees (1976–1994)
 Robert D. Rachlin, Partner in Downs Rachlin Martin PLLC, the state's largest law firm, current professor at Vermont Law School
 Norman Redlich, Warren Commission researcher, VLS Board of Trustees (1977–1999)
 Rodney Smolla, president at Vermont Law School beginning in July 2022
 Benjamin K. Sovacool, founding Director of the Energy Security & Justice Program at their Institute for Energy and Environment
 Gus Speth, co-founder of Natural Resources Defense Council, professor from 2020 to 2015

Notable alumni
 Arnie Arnesen, J.D. 1981, member, New Hampshire House of Representatives (1985–1993), Democratic nominee for Governor of New Hampshire, 1992, candidate for United States House of Representatives, 1996
 Sarah E. Buxton, J.D. 2010, former member of the Vermont House of Representatives
 Karen Carroll, J.D. 1988, associate justice of the Vermont Supreme Court since 2017
 William D. Cohen, J.D. 1984, associate justice of the Vermont Supreme Court
 Harold "Duke" Eaton Jr., J.D. 1980, Vermont Supreme Court Associate Justice (2014–present)
 Vincent Illuzzi, J.D. 1978, youngest person ever elected to Vermont State Senate, State Senator 1981–2013, Essex County State's Attorney since 1998, unsuccessful 2012 Republican nominee for Vermont Auditor of Accounts
 Elizabeth MacDonough, J.D. 1998, first woman to serve as Parliamentarian of the United States Senate
Richard McCormack, M.S. 2002, member of the Vermont Senate
 Charles A. Murphy, J.D. 1990, member of the Massachusetts House of Representatives and chairman of the House Ways and Means Committee
 Sterry R. Waterman, J.D. 1977, Judge of the United States Court of Appeals for the Second Circuit
Susanne R. Young, Vermont Attorney General beginning in June 2022

See also 
 List of American institutions of higher education
 List of colleges and universities in Vermont

References

External links 
 

 

Environmental law schools
Educational institutions established in 1972
Private universities and colleges in Vermont
Law schools in Vermont
Independent law schools in the United States
Royalton, Vermont
Education in Windsor County, Vermont
1972 establishments in Vermont